Formula One Arcade is a racing video game developed by Studio 33 and published by Sony Computer Entertainment exclusively for PlayStation.

Gameplay
Formula One Arcade is based on the 2001 Formula One World Championship, though the game was centered on hectic racing action and is considered unrealistic. Players compete in a faster paced race consisting of a few laps, collecting checkpoints and pickups such as a speed boost, large tires (which give the car more grip) and shields. Gameplay resembles that of Mario Kart, rather than that of traditional Formula One games.

References

External links

2002 video games
Europe-exclusive video games
Formula One video games
Multiplayer and single-player video games
PlayStation (console) games
PlayStation (console)-only games
Sony Interactive Entertainment games
Video games developed in the United Kingdom
Video games set in Australia
Video games set in Austria
Video games set in Malaysia
Video games set in Brazil
Video games set in Spain
Video games set in Monaco
Video games set in Canada
Video games set in France
Video games set in the United Kingdom
Video games set in Germany
Video games set in Hungary
Video games set in Belgium
Video games set in Italy
Video games set in Indiana
Video games set in Japan